Ahva (lit. Brotherhood) or AHVA may refer to:

Ahva (political party), a small political party established in 1980
Ahva, Israel, a village in southern Israel
Ahva Academic College, a college located near the aforementioned village
IPS panel#Advanced Hyper-Viewing Angle (AHVA), an LCD display technology

See also 
 Ahava (disambiguation)